Friedrich Prince zu Schwarzenberg, or in Czech Bedřich prince ze Schwarzenberg (April 6, 1809 in Vienna, Austria – March 27, 1885 in Vienna, Austria) was a Catholic Cardinal of the nineteenth century in Austria and the Kingdom of Bohemia and a member of the House of Schwarzenberg.

Biography

He was the youngest child of John Joseph, Prince of Schwarzenberg and of his wife Pauline d'Arenberg and brother to Austrian Prime Minister Felix, Prince of Schwarzenberg. He was christened as Friedrich Johann Joseph Cölestin. After his mother was incinerated during a ball given in Paris in celebration of Napoleon's marriage to Marie Louise of Austria, he was placed under the care of Father Lorenz Greif and soon devoted himself to studying for the priesthood. Friedrich began his theological studies at Salzburg but completed his last year of theology in Vienna, where he was ordained to the priesthood at the age of 24. Friedrich was thought so highly of, that a papal dispensation was requested to elevate him to Archbishopric of Salzburg in 1835 even though he was not, according to canon law, old enough.

As Archbishop of Salzburg, his main priority over the following decade was the elimination of Protestantism in his diocese. Whilst he accepted the imperial resolution of 1837 demanding the emigration of Protestants, it turned out that Friedrich was deeply ambivalent because he knew that demanding Protestants to leave in such a way would adversely affect the lives of their families, especially their children. He was also a major patron of the arts and of charities during these years, establishing a major college for the study of music.

He was named a cardinal at the age of thirty-three in 1842 and after the Protestant issue had settled, he turned his focus to improving diocesan government through more regular meetings of bishops, as had been decreed by the Council of Trent. This did not prove a great success and Schwarzenberg was transferred to the see of Prague by Pope Pius IX in 1850, having been elected its Archbishop a year before. During his long period in Prague (1849 - 1885), Schwarzenberg's chief focus was on the relationship between Church and State in the Austro-Hungarian Empire, however the success he achieved in this role was at best moderate.

In 1853, he consecrated his cousin Friedrich Egon von Fürstenberg as bishop, who later joined him in the College of Cardinals.

He did not participate in the conclave of 1846 because it was difficult owing to the prevailing political situation for him to travel to Rome, but participated in the conclave of 1878, when he was one of four men still alive who were already cardinals when Pius IX was elected for the longest papal reign in history. The others were Luigi Amat di San Filippo e Sorso, Fabio Maria Asquini and Domenico Carafa della Spina di Traetto.

He died on March 27, 1885 
after a long period of poor health. He was the last surviving cardinal elevated by Pope Gregory XVI and the last participant in the conclave that elected Pope Pius IX.

See also
 Würzburg Bishops' Conference

References

External links

 The Cardinals of the Holy Roman Church: Biographical Dictionary - Pope Gregory XVI
 Friedrich, Prince of Schwarzenberg

1809 births
1885 deaths
Nobility from Vienna
Friedrich
19th-century Austrian cardinals
Roman Catholic archbishops of Prague
Roman Catholic archbishops of Salzburg
Cardinals created by Pope Gregory XVI
Burials at St. Vitus Cathedral
Clergy from Vienna